Millikin University is a private college in Decatur, Illinois. It was founded in 1901 by prominent Decatur businessman James Millikin and is affiliated with the Presbyterian Church (USA).

Academics
Millikin confers graduate and post-graduate certificates and degrees. Its most popular undergraduate majors, based on number out of 403 graduates in 2022, were:
Registered Nursing/Registered Nurse (55)
Musical Theatre (31)
Business Administration and Management (28)
Drama and Dramatics/Theatre Arts (27)
Biology/Biological Sciences (25)

Media

Decaturian
The Decaturian, also known as the Dec (official nickname), is the bi-weekly student newspaper. The Decaturian was established in 1903 and its issues are archived online from 1903–1951, made possible by the Digital-Decaturian Project.

WJMU 89.5 The Quad
WJMU is Millikin University's student-operated freeform format radio station. In addition to its musical responsibilities, WJMU also creates its own public service announcements, liners, news, Millikin sports programming and promotional materials.

On April 25, 1922, a license was issued for a new AM broadcasting station, operating on a wavelength of 360 meters (833 kHz). This station was randomly assigned the call letters WBAO, which came from a sequential roster of available call signs. It maintained a limited schedule of broadcasts.  On May 25, 1928, the Federal Radio Commission (FRC) issued General Order 32, which notified 164 stations, including WBAO, that "From an examination of your application for future license it does not find that public interest, convenience, or necessity would be served by granting it." On September 1, 1928, the FRC listed "Stations WJBL and WBAO" as one of the "consolidations which have been approved by the commission, or imposed on the stations by the commission". WBAO was formally deleted on October 1, 1928, and it was announced that programs previously broadcast by that station would now be heard over WJBL.

Rankings
In 2021, U.S. News & World Report ranked Millikin University #12 in "Regional Colleges Midwest", #11 in Best Undergraduate Teaching, and #29 in Best Value Schools, noting that the institution had selective admissions and a student-faculty ratio of 10:1.

Fraternities and sororities

Fraternities
 Alpha Tau Omega
 Delta Sigma Phi
 Sigma Alpha Epsilon
 Tau Kappa Epsilon
 Sigma Lambda Beta
 Phi Mu Alpha
 Alpha Phi Alpha

Sororities

 Alpha Chi Omega
Alpha Kappa Alpha
 Delta Delta Delta
 Delta Sigma Theta
 Pi Beta Phi
Sigma Alpha Iota 
 Sigma Lambda Gamma

Co-ed

 Alpha Phi Omega (service)
 Alpha Psi Omega (academic)
 Sigma Delta Pi (academic)
 Sigma Tau Delta (academic)

Athletics

Since their first year of athletics in the 1903–04 academic year and prior to joining the NCAA Division III and the CCIW in the 1946–47 season, Millikin primarily competed as an Independent of the National Association of Intercollegiate Athletics (NAIA). Millikin University teams have since participated in the National Collegiate Athletic Association's Division III. The Big Blue are a member of the College Conference of Illinois and Wisconsin (CCIW). Men's sports include baseball, basketball, cross country, football, golf, wrestling, soccer, swimming and diving, tennis, track and field, and volleyball; while women's sports include basketball, cross country, golf, soccer, softball, triathlon, swimming & diving, tennis, track & field and volleyball.

Notable alumni

Actors and musicians
Jodi Benson – Actress: voice of Ariel in the 1989 film The Little Mermaid and Polly Baker in the original Broadway cast of Crazy for You
 Sierra Boggess – Actress: originated roles of Ariel in the 2007 Broadway production of The Little Mermaid and Rosalie Mullins in the 2015 Broadway production of School of Rock. She also portrayed Christine Daae in 2010's Love Never Dies and in the 25th anniversary performances of The Phantom of the Opera on both West End and Broadway.
Joel Kim Booster – Actor / Comedian: writer and star of Fire Island, Jun Ho in NBC's Sunnyside
 Hedy Burress – Actress: Wyleen Pritchett in Boston Common; voice of Yuna in Final Fantasy X
 Annamary Dickey  – Actress and soprano of the Metropolitan Opera and Broadway
 Katelyn Epperly – Singer: American Idol season 9 (top 16)
 Tad Hilgenbrink – Actor: Matt Stifler in American Pie: Band Camp
Michael Maize – Actor: portrayed Daniel in National Treasure: Book of Secrets
 Emerson Swinford – Musician: guitarist and composer
 Annie Wersching – Actress: portrays FBI agent Renee Walker on the television show 24
 Matthew West – Musician: contemporary Christian artist
Monica Witni – Composer and double bassist

Artists
 Herbert D. Ryman – Disney artist, imagineer, and chief designer of the Cinderella Castle

Athletes and coaches
Millikin University was a member of the Illinois Intercollegiate Athletic Conference from 1910 to 1937.

 George Corbett – football player: Chicago Bears running back from 1932–1938
 Sid Gepford – NFL player in 1920
 Lori Kerans – basketball coach, gave Millikin first NCAA D3 national championship win; coached from 1985–2018
 Fred T. Long – Negro league baseball player and college football coach: played four seasons in Negro National League and amassed a 227-151-31 coaching record from 1921–1965 at various colleges including three Black college football national championships (1928, 1932, 1945)
 Harry Long – college football coach, won a Black college football national championship in 1924 as coach of Paul Quinn College; assistant coach to his brother Fred for his 1932 and 1945 championships
 Chuck Martin – football head coach at Miami of Ohio; former coach of Division 2 national champion Grand Valley State
 Danny Moeller – Major League Baseball player, 1907–1916, with Pittsburgh Pirates and Washington Senators
 Jeff Monken – football head coach at United States Military Academy
 Marcia Morey – swimmer at Montreal Olympic Games in 1976 in women's 100m breaststroke and 200m breaststroke;  former American record holder in 200M Breaststroke
 George Musso – football player: Chicago Bears lineman from 1933–1944; nine-year team captain, elected to the Pro Football Hall of Fame in 1982
 Jeff Query – football player: former Green Bay Packers and Cincinnati Bengals wide receiver; 141 receptions for 1,865 yards and 11 touchdowns in 84 career games.
 Mike Rowland – pitcher for San Francisco Giants, 1980–1981
 Don Shroyer – college football coach at Millikin University and Southern Illinois University
 Virgil Wagner – Canadian Football League player, Montreal Alouettes halfback from 1946–54; elected to Canadian Football Hall of Fame in 1980
 Art Wilson – Major League Baseball player

Authors and media figures
 Alice Ambrose (1906–2001) – philosopher, logician, and author
 Florence Page Jaques (1890–1972) – author
 Lucille Ryman Carroll – Hollywood talent executive during early 20th century
 Gigi Goode – American drag queen and runner-up on RuPaul's Drag Race (season 12)

Business figures
 Douglas R. Oberhelman – Chairman and Chief Executive Officer of Caterpillar Inc.
 A.E. Staley (Hon.) - Founder and Chairman of the Board of A.E. Staley Manufacturing Company, now Primient

Higher Education leaders
 Trevor Bates - President of Wilmington College
 James L. Fisher - President of Towson University and the Council for Advancement and Support of Education

Public Service
 Jeff Armbruster - Ohio State Senator for District 13 from 1999 to 2006
 Scott R. Britton - Member of the Cook County Board of Commissioners
 Rodney L. Davis – (2013 - 2023) United States Congressman (R-Illinois) and former Mayor of Taylorville, Illinois
 Thomas W. Ewing – United States Congressman (R-Illinois)
 Melvin R. Laird, Sr. – Wisconsin State Senator and clergyman
 Robert Madigan - Illinois State Senator and brother of Congressman and Cabinet Secretary Edward Madigan
 James Benton Parsons – Federal judge; in 1961 he was the first African American to serve as a US Federal District Judge, appointed to the Northern District of Illinois, in Chicago, IL
 Elbert S. Smith - Illinois State Senator, Illinois Auditor of Public Accounts, Vice-President of the 6th Illinois Constitutional Convention
 Kevin Vann - Roman Catholic Bishop of Orange (CA) and former Bishop of Fort Worth
 Thomas D. Westfall, (1927–2005) – former mayor of El Paso, Texas
 Rickey Williams Jr. (1977/1978–) – the first African-American to serve as mayor of Danville, Illinois

See also
National Bird-Feeding Society#Bird seed preferences (NBFS)

References

External links
 

 
Buildings and structures in Decatur, Illinois
Educational institutions established in 1901
Liberal arts colleges in Illinois
Tourist attractions in Macon County, Illinois
Education in Macon County, Illinois
Universities and colleges affiliated with the Presbyterian Church (USA)
Private universities and colleges in Illinois
1901 establishments in Illinois